Twin Rocks may refer to:
Twin Rocks, Alaska, near Kiska Island, Alaska
Twin Rocks, Seward-Hope, Alaska, near Seward, Alaska
Twin Rocks, California
Twin Rocks, Oregon
Twin Rocks, Pennsylvania